The governor of Basilan, is the chief executive of the provincial government of Basilan.

Military Governors (1973-1975)

Civilian Governors (1975-2025)

References

Governors of Basilan
Basilan